Fremont Township is a township in Winona County, Minnesota, United States. The population was 355 at the 2010 census.

History
Fremont Township was organized in 1858, and named for John C. Frémont (1813–1890), an American explorer.

Geography

Demographics
As of the census of 2000, there were 360 people, 124 households, and 97 families residing in the township. The population density was 10.0 people per square mile (3.9/km2). There were 139 housing units at an average density of 3.9/sq mi (1.5/km2). The racial makeup of the township was 98.61% White, 0.28% Native American, 0.28% Asian, and 0.83% from two or more races.

There were 124 households, out of which 41.9% had children under the age of 18 living with them, 71.8% were married couples living together, 2.4% had a female householder with no husband present, and 21.0% were non-families. 18.5% of all households were made up of individuals, and 10.5% had someone living alone who was 65 years of age or older. The average household size was 2.90 and the average family size was 3.36.

In the township the population was spread out, with 30.8% under the age of 18, 6.9% from 18 to 24, 25.3% from 25 to 44, 22.5% from 45 to 64, and 14.4% who were 65 years of age or older. The median age was 38 years. For every 100 females, there were 108.1 males. For every 100 females age 18 and over, there were 109.2 males.

The median income for a household in the township was $44,583, and the median income for a family was $48,281. Males had a median income of $27,500 versus $24,375 for females. The per capita income for the township was $17,365.  About 6.8% of families and 7.4% of the population were below the poverty line, including 7.1% of those under age 18 and 20.4% of those age 65 or over.

References

Townships in Winona County, Minnesota
Townships in Minnesota